The O.C. Tanner Gift of Music is a series of free concerts presented in Salt Lake City by the Utah Symphony and the Tabernacle Choir at Temple Square, with soloists, conductors and other choirs as guests. The concerts have been hosted by the Church of Jesus Christ of Latter-day Saints (LDS Church) on Temple Square since 1983. The thirtieth anniversary gala concerts were held September 6 and 7, 2013.

Origins
In the 1970s two neighbors Obert C. Tanner, founder of the O.C. Tanner company and Gordon B. Hinckley, a member of the First Presidency of the LDS Church, worked together to foster unity in the growing community of the Wasatch Front. They included the president of the Utah Symphony, Wendell Ashton, and the president of the Mormon Tabernacle Choir, Oakley Evans in these efforts. Their intent was to create a series of free concerts funded by an endowment from Obert and his wife Grace. These concerts would feature the combined talents of the world-famous Choir and the Symphony. Adding famed soloists, conductors and other choirs as guest artists would make these world class concerts.

Gifts Of Music

1983–89

1983: Verdi Requiem
Friday, September 16, 1983

The Salt Lake Tabernacle
 Mormon Tabernacle Choir
 Utah Symphony --- Stanislaw Skrowaczewski, conductor
 Kristine Ciesinski, soloist
 Katherine Ciesinski, soloist
 Arnold Voketaitis, soloist
 Dana Talley, soloist

1985: Americana
 Mormon Tabernacle Choir
 Utah Symphony --- Michael Tilson Thomas, conductor and soloist

1987: Mendelssohn Elijah
 Mormon Tabernacle Choir
 Utah Symphony --- Jerold Ottley, conductor
 Audrey Luna, soloist

1989: operatic and concert selections
Friday & Saturday, February 24 and 25, 1989

Salt Lake Tabernacle
 Mormon Tabernacle Choir
 Utah Symphony --- Julius Rudel, conductor
 Kiri Te Kanawa, soloist

1991–99

1991: operatic and concert selections
Friday and Saturday, November 8 and 9, 1991

Salt Lake Tabernacle
 Mormon Tabernacle Choir
 Utah Symphony --- Joseph Silverstein, conductor
 Frederica von Stade, soloist

1994: Berlioz Requiem
Friday and Saturday, April 22 and 23, 1994

Salt Lake Tabernacle
 Mormon Tabernacle Choir
 Utah Symphony --- Robert Shaw, conductor
 Stanford Olsen, soloist

1996: DeMars An American Requiem
Friday and Saturday, November 1 and 2, 1996

Salt Lake Tabernacle
 Mormon Tabernacle Choir
 Utah Symphony --- James DeMars, composer & conductor
 Audrey Luna, soloist
 Linda Priebe, soloist
 Robert Breault, soloist
 Simon Estes, soloist

1998: an Atlantic bridge
Friday and Saturday, November 13 and 14, 1998

Salt Lake Tabernacle
 Mormon Tabernacle Choir
 Utah Symphony --- Craig Jessop, conductor
 The King's Singers, soloists

1999: Brahms Requiem
Saturday, February 13, 1999

Salt Lake Tabernacle
 Mormon Tabernacle Choir
 Utah Symphony --- Craig Jessop, conductor
 Janice Chandler Eteme, soloist
 Nathan Gunn, soloist

2000–09

2000: Vaughan Williams Hodie
Friday & Saturday, November 3 and 4, 2000

Salt Lake Tabernacle
 Mormon Tabernacle Choir
 Utah Symphony --- Keith Lockhart, conductor
 Henriette Schellenberg, soloist
 Robert Breault, soloist
Robert Honeysucker, soloist
 International Children's Choir, guest
 Temple Square Chorale, guest
 SUU Concert Choir, guest

2002: Mahler Symphony no. 8
Friday and Saturday, November 15 and 16, 2002

Salt Lake Tabernacle
 Mormon Tabernacle Choir
 Utah Symphony --- Keith Lockhart, conductor
 Bridgett Hooks, soloist
 Indra Thomas, soloist
 Mary Ellen Callahan, soloist
 Barbara Rearjck, soloist
 Rebekah Ambosini, soloist
 John Daniecki, soloist
 Clayton Brainerd, soloist
 Les Young, soloist
 Utah Symphony Chorus, guest
 Choristers of the Madeleine Choir School, guest
 International Children's Choir, guest
 Salt Lake Children's Choir, guest
 SUU Concert Choir, guest

2005: a Celtic celebration
Friday & Saturday, October 21 and 22, 2005

Conference Center
 Mormon Tabernacle Choir
 Utah Symphony --- Craig Jessop & Mack Wilberg, conductors
 Ronan Tynan, soloist
 Leahy, soloist
 Wasatch & District Pipe Band, guests

2008: an American songbook
George M. Cohan, Richard Rodgers, John Williams, Woody Guthrie, Irving Berlin and other American composers

Friday & Saturday, September 19 and 20, 2008

Conference Center
 Mormon Tabernacle Choir
 Utah Symphony --- Erich Kunzel, guest conductor
 Denyce Graves, soloist
 Brian Stokes Mitchell, soloist

2009: Mahler Symphony no. 2
Friday and Saturday, November 20 and 21, 2009

Salt Lake Tabernacle
 Mormon Tabernacle Choir
 Utah Symphony --- Keith Lockhart, conductor
 Janice Chandler Eteme, soloist
 Nancy Maultsby, soloist

2011–present

2011: Berlioz Requiem
Friday & Saturday, September 16 and 17, 2011

Salt Lake Tabernacle
 Mormon Tabernacle Choir
 Utah Symphony --- Thierry Fischer, conductor

2013: 30th anniversary gala
Friday & Saturday, September 6 and 7, 2013

Conference Center
 Mormon Tabernacle Choir
 Utah Symphony --- Mack Wilberg, conductor
 James Taylor, Special Guest

2019: Golden Spike 150th Anniversary

Friday, May 10th, 2019

 Tabernacle Choir at Temple Square
 Utah Symphony
 Brian Stokes Mitchell, Megan Hilty special guests

References

Tabernacle Choir
Music of Utah